Mina Maksimovic (born 1 May, 1983) is a former Serbian professional basketball player and a former member of the Serbian national team. She was born in Kragujevac, Serbia.

External links
Profile at eurobasket.com
 at overblog.com

1983 births
Living people
Sportspeople from Kragujevac
Power forwards (basketball)
Centers (basketball)
Serbian women's basketball players
ŽKK Partizan players
ŽKK Voždovac players
Universiade medalists in basketball
Universiade silver medalists for Serbia and Montenegro